David Romann (born 4 May 1970) is a French volleyball player. He competed in the men's tournament at the 1992 Summer Olympics.

References

External links
 
 
 

1970 births
Living people
French men's volleyball players
Olympic volleyball players of France
Volleyball players at the 1992 Summer Olympics
Sportspeople from Mulhouse